Hadım Mehmed Pasha (Turkish: Hadım Mehmet Paşa) was a Georgian Ottoman statesman. He was Grand Vizier of the Ottoman Empire between 21 September 1622 and 5 February 1623. He was also the Ottoman governor of Egypt from 1604 to 1605.

See also 
 List of Ottoman Grand Viziers
 List of Ottoman governors of Egypt

References 

17th-century Grand Viziers of the Ottoman Empire
17th-century Ottoman governors of Egypt
Georgians from the Ottoman Empire
Muslims from Georgia (country)
Ottoman governors of Egypt
Eunuchs from the Ottoman Empire